Music for Children is the first release in John Zorn's Music Romance Series and features three Naked City compositions (written at the time of Torture Garden) performed by Zorn with the band Prelapse; a 20-minute composition for wind machines and controlled feedback systems dedicated to Edgar Varese, and a  classical chamber music piece for violin, percussion and piano performed by the Abel-Steinberg-Winant Trio framed by a poly-rhythmic etude for percussion and celeste and a lullaby for music box.

Reception

The Allmusic review by  Stacia Proefrock awarded the album 4 stars out of 5, stating "The adventurous parents who actually play this music for their child may be horrified to discover how much the little baby genius actually likes it. For those who are childless or simply less brave, this volume provides fascinating candy for adult ears."

Track listing 
All compositions by John Zorn
 "Fils des Etoiles" – 2:16
 "This Way Out" – 1:10
 "Music for Children" – 14:17
 "Bikini Atoll" – 0:46
 "Bone Crusher" – 0:38
 "Dreamer of Dreams" – 5:48
 "Cycles du Nord" – 20:54
 "Sooki’s Lullaby" – 3:17

Personnel 
 Prelapse
 David Abel – violin 
 Cyro Baptista – percussion, vocals 
 Greg Cohen – bass
 Anthony Coleman – celeste, music box 
 Erik Friedlander – cello 
 Jeff Hudgins - alto saxophone
 Dane Johnson - guitar
 Alex Lacamoire - keyboards
 Lou Reed - vocals
 Marc Ribot – guitar 
 Andy Sanesi - drums
 Julie Steinberg – piano 
 Mason Wendell – bass, vocals
 William Winant – percussion 
 John Zorn – alto saxophone, wind machines, acoustic feedback systems

References 

John Zorn albums
Albums produced by John Zorn
Tzadik Records albums
1998 albums